Abduljabbar Nasuru Kabara (born 7 February 1970) Abduljabbar is a Nigerian controversial Islamic cleric and a Qadiriyya scholar based in Kano, Nigeria, accused of blasphemy towards the Islamic prophet Muhammad. He is the son of Nasuru Kabara, the former leader of the Qadiriyya sect of West Africa and a junior brother to Karibullah Nasir Kabara the successor of their late father.

Early life 
Abduljabbar was born in Kabara town in the city of Kano State, Nigeria, to the family of the prominent Qadiriyya leader of West Africa Sheikh Nasir Kabara. His mother's name is Hajiya Hafsah Adussamad. He is a brother to the current Qadiriyya leader of West Africa known as Qaribullahi Nasuru Kabara, his brother leading the Qadiriyya Movement in Nigeria since the demise of their father in the year 1996.

Education 
Like all others of the Kabara family, Abduljabbar attended Ma'ahad School. He received further education at Aliya and ATC Gwale, then moved to Iraq to advance his studies, but himself claimed he obtained most of his education from his father for almost 25 years of his life.

Islamic faith 
Abduljabbar throughout his life was well known as a Qadiriyya follower and a scholar by Muslims communities in Nigeria, following the footsteps of his father, later on around the year 2020 to 2021, he expressed his faith as a Shia believer during an interview with BBC Hausa, saying "after a thoroughly long time research which I have made by myself,  I realized that Shi'a have more scriptural evidence over Sunni Islam in that aspect"  He said "I will not bother myself if you call me a Shi'a, but I'll be concerned with calling me a Sunni".

Personal life 
He is a son to Nasuru Kabara and Hajiya Hafsah Adussamad, He is married with children. He likes tourism to countries like Saudi Arabia, Iraq, Russia, Syria and United Arab Emirates.

Islamic debate 
Abduljabbar was accused several times of blasphemy towards Muhammad, to some of the companions of Muhammad, to Ahl al-Bayt (relatives of Muhammad), according to Abduljabbar, some hadith narrated by Anas Ibn Malik, Bukhari and Muslim are in accusations towards Muhammad, which he Abduljabbar is now scaling the Hadith as hoax and accusations towards Muhammad, he is now objecting the Hadiths, and the context of the  accusations.

According to Abduljabbar He is objecting those hadith narrated by Bukhari and Muslim not supporting them, whenever Abduljabbar is preaching, giving fatwa or giving Islamic sermon during Jumu'at congregation, He use to make it open by challenging everyone, saying that he seek a legal Islamic verdict debate against any Nigerian Islamic scholar who is willing to provide Islamic scriptural evidence, which will serve as an Islamic evidence that what he is saying about the Hadiths are untrue, although many Kano and Nigerian Islamic scholars are objecting the existence and the wrong interpretations of the Hadiths given by Abduljabbar respectively, but he says he seeks a mukabala (Islamic debate) eye to eye.

Abduljabbar was held captive by Kano State Government, after the Kano State Islamic scholars from Izala Society, Salafiyya, Tijaniyyah and Qadiriyya reported Abduljabbar to the state government, saying "They have come along with nine blasphemy which was stated by Abduljabbar in his preaching towards Muhammad in video and audio format, which will serve as a reference that Abduljabbar is making blasphemy towards Muhammad, and that if care is not taken, the blasphemy will lead to Islamic bloodshed and chaos in the State", the state government decided to take part in the matter, the government decided that Abduljabbar will be putten to justice, but before then, the Kano State government wants to justify the matter to give Abduljabbar a chance which he always seek to have a debate, to present his scriptural evidence, so that to see if what he is saying is absolutely right, which will let him go free without any charges.

On 10 Saturday, July 2021, the government of Kano State officially organize the debate between him and four young Islamic sheikhs as representatives from Izala Society, Salafiyya, Tijjaniyya and Qadiriyya, in person of late Sheikh Mas'ud Mas'ud Hoto representing Qadiriyya sect. Dr Rabi'u Muhammad Umar Rijiyar Lemu representing Salafiyyah, Abubakar Mai Madatai representing Tijjaniyya sect and Kabir Bashir Kofar Wambai representing Izala sect.

The debate was chaired by Professor Salisu Shehu from Bayero University Kano, also in watch of Commissioner for Religious Affairs Kano State, the chairman of the debate Professor Salisu Shehu declared that Abduljabbar did not answer a single question asked by the other scholars, He said "Abduljabbar duged questions by giving irrelevant information or saying there's no time to make references from the over five hundreds books which He brought to the debate, although he have assistants to assist him, while the other scholars have given references and answers to Abduljabbar's questions directly".

Criticism 
Abduljabbar was considered one of the most controversial Muslim scholars in Kano State, He  was accused by majority of Nigerian Islamic clerics for making Blasphemy against the Muhammad's Companions indirectly and to Muhammad himself, the blasphemy cause a lot of quarrels and objection from Nigerian Islamic scholars from Izala Movement in Nigeria, Salafi movement and the rest of Ɗarika clerics, especially his brother Qaribullahi Nasuru Kabara who rejected his entire Fatwa and said his fatwa has nothing to do with Qadiriyya. As a result of the blasphemy and possibilities of chaos, the Government of Kano State under the leadership of Abdullahi Umar Ganduje closed his Mosque and banned Abduljabbar from teaching and making Da'awah in the entire state of Kano. Abduljabbar during an interview with BBC Hausa he said the act of the Kano State government for banning him is injustice. the state government denied the demolition of Abduljabbar's school in the State after a rumor they have heard in the State.

Many Nigerian Islamic scholars said Abduljabbar led many Muslims people astray.

Imprisonment 
On 17 July 2021, he was imprisoned of blasphemy towards Muhammad.

On 15th December 2022, upper Shari'a Court in Kano sentenced Abduljabbar to death by hanging after he was found guilty of blasphemy against the Prophet Muhammad.

See also 

 Dahiru Usman Bauchi
 Qadiriyya
 Tijaniyyah

References

External links 
 BBC Hausa interview with Abduljabbar.

Living people
People from Kano State
Hausa people
1970 births